This is an list of recording artists who have reached number one on the Irish Singles Chart.

All acts are listed alphabetically.
Solo artists are alphabetized by last name, Groups by group name excluding "A," "An" and "The.".
Each act's total of number-one singles is shown after their name.
Featured artists that have been given credit on the record are included

0–9
112 (1)
2 Unlimited (1)
4 Non Blondes (1)
5 Seconds Of Summer (2)
10cc (3)
21 Demands (2)
21 Savage (1)
24kGoldn (1)
50 Cent (1)
070 Shake (1)

A

B

C

D

E
Eamon (1)
East 17 (2)
Eiffel 65 (1)
ELO (1)
Billie Eilish (3)
Sophie Ellis-Bextor (1)
Eminem (9)
Emmet Spiceland Ballad Group (1)
Enigma (2)
Enya (1) 
Erasure (1)
Europe (1)
Faith Evans (1)
Eve (1)
Example (1)
George Ezra (1)

F

G

H

I
Frank Ifield (3)
Enrique Iglesias (1)
Industry (2)
Irish World Cup Squad (2002) (1)

J

K

L

M

N

O

P

Q
Suzi Quatro (1)
Queen (3)

R

S

T

U
U2 (21)
UB40 (2)
Tracey Ullman (1)
Ultravox (1)
Midge Ure (1)
Usher (2)

V
Vanilla Ice (2)
(A Song for Lily Mae) Various Artists – "Tiny Dancer" (2012) (1)
Various Artists – "The Rocky Road to Poland" (2012) (1)
Various Artists – "The Ballad of Ronnie Drew" (2008) (1)
Various Artists – "Candle For Kosovo" (1999) (1)
Various Artists – "Perfect Day" (1997) (1)
Various Artists – "The Brits Mix 1990" (1990) (1)
The Veronicas (1)
Vika Jigulina (1)
Village People (1)

W

X
XTM & DJ Chucky presents Annia (1)

Y
Daddy Yankee (1)
Yazz & The Plastic Population (2)
Yolanda Be Cool (1)
Paul Young (2)
Will Young (1)

Z
Zager and Evans (1)
Zayn (1)
Zig & Zag (2)
Zoo (an Irish band, not the J-Pop or Norwegian bands of the same name) (1)

See also 
Irish Singles Chart
List of songs that reached number one on the Irish Singles Chart
List of artists who reached number one on the UK Singles Chart

External links 
IRMA Official Site
Chart archive to 1964

References

Number one
Irish record chart
Artists who reached number one in Ireland